Monte Viso or Monviso (Piedmontese: Brich Monviso or Viso) is the highest mountain of the Cottian Alps. It is located in Italy close to the French border. Monte Viso is well known for its pyramid-like shape and, because it is higher than all its neighbouring peaks by about 500 m, it can be seen from a great distance, including from the Piedmontese plateau, the Langhe, the Theodulpass in the Zermatt ski area, the col du Galibier and the summits of the Mont Blanc massif. On a very clear day it can be seen from the spires of Milan Cathedral.

It has been suggested that Monte Viso could be one of the mountains which inspired the Paramount logo. In Italy it is also known as Il Re di Pietra ("The Stone King") because of its prominence within the western Italian Alps. It was declared a cross-border UNESCO biosphere reserve in 2013.
It is also a mountain of the birth of the longest river of Italy, River Po.

Geography 
On the northern slopes of Monte Viso are the headwaters of the Po, the longest Italian river, the so-called Pian del Re (2,020 m). The Monviso group is surrounded by the Valle Po, Valle Varaita and, on the French side, the Guil valley. The northern sector of the group, from the Punta Gastaldi to the Col de la Traversette, is located on the French border.

SOIUSA classification 
According to the SOIUSA (International Standardized Mountain Subdivision of the Alps) the mountain can be classified in the following way:
 main part = Western Alps
 major sector = South Western Alps
 section = Cottian Alps
 subsection = southern Cottian Alps
 supergroup = catena Aiguillette-Monviso-Granero
 group = gruppo del Monviso isa
 subgroup = nodo del Monviso
 code = I/A-4.I-C.8.a

History 
Monte Viso is the location of a neolithic jadeite quarry, at an elevation of 2000 to 2400 metres. Its productivity peaked around 5000 BC. The jadeite was used to make cult axes, which are found all over western Europe. One such ceremonial axe head was found as far away as a small hill called Tristia in Western Ireland and is on display in the National Museum of Ireland – Archaeology, Dublin.

In ancient times the mountain was known as Vesulus.

Monte Viso was climbed for the first time on August 30, 1861 by William Mathews, Frederick Jacomb, Jean-Baptiste Croz and Michel Croz. The first woman to summit the mountain was Alessandra Boarelli (1838–1908) on 16 August 1864.

Monte Viso in literature 

Monte Viso is mentioned by various authors, Italian and non-, including Dante, Petrarch, and Chaucer.  Dante mentions the mountain in a long simile in Canto XVI of the Inferno as the source of the Montone River:

	
	

Chaucer cites the mountain in the prologue to the Clerk's Tale in his Canterbury Tales, in a passage adapted from Petrarch's Latin version of his "Tale of Griselda":

 
 
(Geoffrey Chaucer, "The Clerk's Tale," from The Canterbury Tales)

See also

 List of Alpine peaks by prominence
 List of mountains of the Alps above 3000 m
 Monte Viso tunnel

References

Bibliography

External links 

Monte Viso on SummitPost

Alpine three-thousanders
Populated places established in the 5th millennium BC
Mountains of Piedmont
Mountains of the Alps
Archaeological sites in Italy
Province of Cuneo
Neolithic
Biosphere reserves of France
Biosphere reserves of Italy
Three-thousanders of Italy